Ulf Bo Samuelsson (born March 26, 1964) is a Swedish-American former professional ice hockey defenceman who formerly served as assistant coach of the Florida Panthers of the National Hockey League. He played several seasons in the NHL with the Hartford Whalers, Pittsburgh Penguins, New York Rangers, Detroit Red Wings, and Philadelphia Flyers. He was a two-time Stanley Cup champion as a member of the Penguins in 1991 and 1992 and is the first European-born player to have 2,000 career penalty minutes.

During his playing career, Samuelsson was viewed by NHL stars as "the most hated man in hockey"; he was described to the New York Times as "the lowest form of human being" and someone whose play is all about "trying to hurt you and knock you out of the game". He is also infamous for his knee-to-knee hit on Boston Bruins Cam Neely during the 1991 playoffs that was a contributing factor of Neely's early retirement five years later.

Playing career
Samuelsson was selected 67th overall by the Hartford Whalers in the 1982 NHL Entry Draft. In February 1987, Samuelsson played in the "Rendez-vous '87" series as a member of the NHL All-Stars. The two-game series between the NHL All-Stars and the Soviet national team took place in Quebec City and replaced the NHL's mid-season all-star game for the 1986–87 season.

He was traded to the Pittsburgh Penguins along with Ron Francis in 1991 and was a member of Pittsburgh's Stanley Cup winning team in 1991 and 1992. He scored the 1991 Stanley Cup-winning goal in game six of the finals against the Minnesota North Stars, at 2:00 of the first period in what became an 8–0 blowout victory for Pittsburgh.

In a game versus the Boston Bruins during the 1991 Stanley Cup Playoffs, Samuelsson hit Bruins' star forward Cam Neely with a knee-on-knee check that injured Neely and caused him to develop a condition called myositis ossificans, which ultimately ended his career.

As a member of the New York Rangers in 1995, Samuelsson was knocked unconscious by a punch to the face from Tie Domi of the Toronto Maple Leafs. Domi received an eight-game suspension and a fine for the incident. Domi insisted that Samuelsson provoked the punch by repeatedly calling him "dummy".

Samuelsson played 1,080 career NHL games, scoring 57 goals and 275 assists for 332 points. He accumulated 2,453 penalty minutes over the course of his career.

During the Nagano Olympics, he was ejected from the Swedish team when it was discovered that he had requested and received US citizenship. His Swedish citizenship was revoked and he was not allowed to play. The entire ordeal was listed as the seventy-second most important international story by the IIHF in their centennial celebrations in 2008.

Transactions
March 4, 1991 – traded by the Hartford Whalers, along with Ron Francis and Grant Jennings, to the Pittsburgh Penguins in exchange for John Cullen, Jeff Parker, and Zarley Zalapski
August 31, 1995 – traded by the Pittsburgh Penguins, along with Luc Robitaille, to the New York Rangers in exchange for Petr Nedvěd and Sergei Zubov.
March 23, 1999 – traded by the New York Rangers to the Detroit Red Wings in exchange for Detroit's 1999 second round draft choice and the Rangers' 1999 third round draft choice.
June 25, 1999 – traded by the Detroit Red Wings to the Atlanta Thrashers in exchange for future considerations.
October 19, 1999 – signed as a free agent by the Philadelphia Flyers.

Personal life
Samuelsson is a resident of Scottsdale, Arizona. Samuelsson's sons, Philip, Henrik and Adam are professional hockey players. His daughter, Victoria, played hockey at Penn State University.

Coaching career
On May 2, 2011, Samuelsson accepted the head coaching position of Modo Hockey, a position he held for two seasons.

On May 31, 2016, it was announced that Samuelsson accepted a head coach position with the Charlotte Checkers of the American Hockey League. In 2017 Samuelsson was hired as an assistant coach with the Chicago Blackhawks of the National Hockey League. On November 6, 2018, he was fired along with head coach Joel Quenneville.

 2003–04, head coach, Phantoms Ice Hockey Club squirt minor AAA
 2004–05, assistant coach, Avon Old Farms School
 2005–06, assistant coach, Hartford Wolf Pack
 2006–11, assistant coach, Phoenix Coyotes
 2011–13, head coach, Modo Hockey
 2013–16, assistant coach, New York Rangers
 2016–17, head coach, Charlotte Checkers
 2017–18, assistant coach, Chicago Blackhawks
 2019–20, pro scout, Seattle Kraken
 2019–20, head coach, Leksands IF
 2020–21, assistant coach, Florida Panthers

Career statistics

Regular season and playoffs

International

Career achievements
 2× Stanley Cup champion – 1991, 1992

See also
 List of NHL players with 1,000 games played
 List of NHL players with 2,000 career penalty minutes

References

External links
 
 Hockey Draft Central

1964 births
Living people
Arizona Coyotes coaches
Binghamton Whalers players
Chicago Blackhawks coaches
Detroit Red Wings players
Hartford Whalers draft picks
Hartford Whalers players
Ice hockey players at the 1998 Winter Olympics
Leksands IF players
National Hockey League All-Stars
New York Rangers players
New York Rangers coaches
Olympic ice hockey players of Sweden
People from Moorestown, New Jersey
People with acquired American citizenship
Philadelphia Flyers players
Pittsburgh Penguins players
Stanley Cup champions
Swedish emigrants to the United States
Swedish expatriate ice hockey players in the United States
Swedish ice hockey coaches
Swedish ice hockey defencemen
Florida Panthers coaches